The Forum of Maltese Unions (FOR.U.M.) is a national trade union federation in Malta incorporating 16,000 members representing workers from a variety of professions and trades.

History
The federation was established in 2004, providing an alternative to the General Workers' Union and the Confederation of Malta Trade Unions (CMTU).  Its initial affiliates were eight small, independent unions.  In 2009, the Malta Union of Teachers joined FOR.U.M., increasing at the time its total affiliated membership to 11,000.  It affiliated to the European Trade Union Confederation in 2011.

Today, For.U.M. has 14 Union affiliates with a total membership of 13,000 workers from different professions and spheres. The Unions affiliated to the For.U.M. are AAE, ALPA, EPOU, ESSU, MUMN, MUT, UCC, UHBC, UMASA, UPAP, UPISP, and UTAC. This Confederation actively participates in all national debates and activities that concern the conditions and rights of workers and their families. For.U.M. is a member of MCESD and MEUSAC.

Affiliates

External links

References

Trade unions established in 2004
Trade unions in Malta